Cairo is an unincorporated community in Malheur County, Oregon, United States. Route 201 also continues north from Cairo Junction through Cairo and towards Ontario.

Cairo was a station on the Oregon Short Line Railroad (OSL) to Vale. The OSL line is now part of the Union Pacific mainline. Cairo Elementary School in Cairo Junction is part of the Ontario School District; the school was built in 1957.

References

Unincorporated communities in Malheur County, Oregon
Unincorporated communities in Oregon